Konstantin Yakovlevich Listov (– 6 September 1983) was a Soviet composer. He is the composer of many widely popular songs, which include "Pesnya o Tachanke" ("Song of the Tachanka"), "V Zemlyanke" ("In a Zemlyanka"), "Hodili My Pohodami", "Sevastopolsky Vals" ("Sevastopol Waltz"). In 1973 he was bestowed the title of People's Artist of the RSFSR.

References

External links 
 
 

Soviet composers
Soviet male composers
Soviet songwriters
People's Artists of the RSFSR
20th-century composers
Soviet conductors (music)
1900 births
1983 deaths
Burials at Kuntsevo Cemetery
20th-century conductors (music)
20th-century Russian male musicians